Winston may be a family name of English origin, or a masculine given name.

People with the surname
Arthur Winston (1906–2006), American centenarian, "Employee of the Century"
Brian Winston (1941–2022), British journalist
Cassius Winston (born 1998), American basketball player
Charles Winston (1814–1864), English historian
Charlie Winston (born 1978), English singer and songwriter
Dallas Winston, fictional character from S. E. Hinton's The Outsiders
Easop Winston (born 1996), American football player
Eric Winston (born 1983), American football player
Francis D. Winston (1857–1941), Lt. Governor of North Carolina
George Winston (born 1949), American pianist
George T. Winston (1852–1932), American educator
Harry Winston (1896–1978), American jeweller
Henry Winston, (1911–1986), American civil rights activist
Hattie Winston (born 1945), American actress
Jameis Winston (born 1994), American football quarterback
James Brown Winston (1820–1884), first medical officer of Los Angeles, California
Jimmy Winston (born 1945), British organist
John A. Winston (1812–1871), American politician, governor of Alabama
Joseph Winston (1746–1815), American politician
Louis L. Winston (1784–1824), justice of the Supreme Court of Mississippi
Matt Winston (born 1970), American actor
Nat T. Winston Jr., American psychiatrist
Patrick Winston (1943–2019), American computer scientist
Peter Winston (born 1958), American chess player
Piney Winston, fictional biker gang member from Sons of Anarchy
Randall Winston, American television producer
Robert Winston, Baron Winston (born 1940), British scientist, politician and TV presenter
Robert Winston (coach) (1847–1913), American football coach
Roy Winston (1940–2022), American football player
Roy Winston (poker player), American poker player
Stan Winston (1946–2008), American special effects and makeup artist

People with the given name

Actors
 Winston Rekert (1949–2012), Canadian actor
 Winston Duke (born 1986), Tobagonian actor
 Winston Ntshona (1941–2018), South African playwright and actor
 Winston Saunders (1941–2006), Bahamian actor
 Winston Doty (1914–1934), child actor
 Winston Chao (born 1960), Taiwanese actor
 Winston Miller (1910–1994), American actor
 Winston Hibler (1910–1976), American actor
 Winston Spear (born 1965), Canadian stand-up comedian and actor 
 Winston Stona (1940–2022), Jamaican actor and businessman
 Winston Severn (born 1942), American former cricketer and child screen actor

Musicians

 Winston Blake (1940–2016), Jamaican sound system operator
 Winston Francis (born 1948), Jamaican singer
 Winston Giles (born 1974), Australian musician
 Winston Grennan (1944–2000), Jamaican drummer
 Winston Hauschild (born 1973), Canadian record producer
 Winston Jarrett (born 1940), Jamaican reggae singer
 Winston Marshall (born 1988), British musician
 Winston McAnuff (born 1957), Jamaican singer
 Winston Hubert McIntosh (1944–1987), Jamaican musician, stage name Peter Tosh
 Winston Mankunku Ngozi (1943–2009), South African tenor saxophone player
 Winston Reedy (born 1950), Jamaican reggae singer
 Winston Riley (1943–2012), Jamaican singer
 Winston Stewart (born 1947), stage name Delano Stewart 
 Winston Tong (born 1951), American singer-songwriter
 Winston Walls, American jazz player
 Winston Wright (1944–1993), Jamaican keyboardist

Politicians

 Winston Baker (born 1939), Canadian politician
 Winston Cenac, civil servant and politician from Saint Lucia
 Winston Chitando, Zimbabwean politician
 Winston Churchill (1620–1688), English soldier, historian, politician
 Winston Churchill (1874–1965), British Prime Minister and statesman
 Winston Churchill (1940–2010), member of British Parliament; grandson of the former Prime Minister
 Winston Crane (born 1941), Australian politician
 Winston Dang (born 1843), Taiwanese politician
 Winston Dookeran (born 1843), Trinidadian politician and economist
 Winston Field (1904–1969), Rhodesian politician
 Winston Garcia (born 1958), Filipino politician
 Winston Green ( (1958/1959–2017), Jamaican politician and dentist
 Winston Jessurun (born 1952), Surinamese politician
 Winston V. Jones (born 1917), Jamaican politician
 Winston Lackin (1954–2019), Surinamese politician and diplomat
 Winston Lord (born 1937), American diplomat
 Winston McKenzie (born 1953), British political activist
 Winston Peters (born 1945), New Zealand politician
 Winston Pond, geothermal activist and politician from Montserrat

Sports

 Winston Abraham (born 1974), Australian footballer
 Winston Anglin (1962–2004), Jamaican international footballer
 Winston Bakboord (born 1971), Dutch footballer
 Winston Bogarde (born 1970), Dutch retired footballer
 Winston Craig (born 1995), American football player
 Winston DuBose, retired American soccer goalkeeper
 Winston Earle, retired Jamaican footballer
 Winston Faerber (born 1971), Dutch-Surinamese former professional footballer
 Winston Foster (born 1941), English former footballer
 Winston Griffiths (1978–2011), Jamaican footballer
 Winston Justice (born 1984), American NFL football player
 Winston Kalengo (born 1985), Zambian footballer
 Winston Mhango (born 1988), Zimbabwean footballer
 Winston October (born 1976), Canadian football player
 Winston Parks (born 1981), Costa Rican former footballer
 Winston Reid (cricketer) (born 1962), Barbadian cricket player
 Winston Reid (born 1988), New Zealand born footballer
 Winston Roberts (born 1976), Antigua and Barbudan football player
 Winston Smith (born 1982), Jamaican track and field sprinter
 Winston Stanley (born 1974), Canadian rugby union footballer
 Winston Stanley (born 1989), Australian-born Samoan former rugby union footballer
 Winston Watts (born 1967), member of the Jamaica national bobsleigh team

Other
 Winston Chu (born 1940), Hong Kong lawyer and activist
 Winston Churchill (novelist) (1871–1947), American novelist
 Winston Chow, American student activist
 Winston Graham (1908–2003), English novelist
 Winston Groom (1943–2020), American novelist, author of Forrest Gump
 Winston Churchill Rea, former leader of the Red Hand Commando (RHC) loyalist paramilitary organisation in Northern Ireland
 Winston E. Scott (born 1950), American astronaut
 Winston M. Scott (1909–1971), American CIA officer
 Winston Smith (born 1952), American artist and illustrator

Fictional characters
Winston (Dennis the Menace), a bully in the 1980s Dennis the Menace animated television series
Winston (EastEnders)
Winston (Overwatch)
Winston, a Peter Tinniswood character
Winston, the janitor's cat in The Bash Street Kids 
Winston, a track inspection vehicle in Thomas & Friends
Winston Bishop, a character in New Girl
Winston Chu (Degrassi character) in Degrassi: The Next Generation
Winston Ingram, a pensioner in BBC's Still Game
Winston Schmidt, a character in New Girl
Winston Smith, from the novel Nineteen Eighty-Four by George Orwell
Winston Williams, a character in the Netflix series 13 Reasons Why
Winston Wolf, a character in the film Pulp Fiction, played by Harvey Keitel
Winston Zeddemore, a character in Ghostbusters

Animals
Winston (horse), a British mounted police horse ridden by Queen Elizabeth II
 Winston, Princess Chelsea's cat featured in multiple music videos, in her album artwork for Lil' Golden Book, and vocals in her song "Winston Crying on the Bathroom Floor".

See also
 Whinston
 Winston (disambiguation)
 Winstone (surname)

References

English masculine given names
English toponymic surnames
Lists of people by given name